The Uru-Eu-Wau-Wau are an indigenous people of Brazil, living in the state of Rondônia.

They live in six villages on the borders of the Uru-Eu-Uaw-Uaw Indigenous Territory, which is shared by two other contacted groups, the Amondawa and Uru Pa In, the latter who speak a Chapacuran language, as well as the Jurureí, Parakua, and two uncontacted tribes whose names are not known.

Name
The Uru-Eu-Wau-Wau people call themselves Jupaú. They are also (mistakenly) known as the Amondauas, Bocas-negras, Bocas-pretas, Cabeça-vermelha, Cautários, Sotérios, Urupain, as well as Jupaú, Black-Mouths, Red-Heads, Urueu-Wau-Wau.

History
The Uru-Eu-Uaw-Uaw came into contact with non-Natives, specifically the National Indian Foundation (FUNAI) in 1981, which was followed by a loss of population. In 1981, there were 250 Uru-Eu-Wau-Wau people, but only 89 in 1993. Diseases and violent attacks by outsiders have killed them. Rubber harvesters fought FUNAI's outlines of Uru-Eu-Wau-Wau lands. In 1991, one of the  world's largest known tin deposits was discovered in Uru-Eu-Wau-Wau lands.

After 1993 their population began increasing again. The Uru-Eu-Uaw-Uaw Indigenous Territory was established by the Brazilian government to protect the tribes and only Indians can legally live in the indigenous territory; however, loggers and miners have regularly invaded their lands. Missionaries are active among the Uru-Eu-Wau-Wau, and an NGO called Kanindé is trying to fight outside influences and assimilationists on the Uru-Eu-Wau-Wau.

Language
The Uru-Eu-Wau-Wau speak one of the nine varieties of the Kagwahiva language, a Tupi–Guarani language, Subgroup IV. The language is also known as Uru-Eu-Uau-Uau, Eru-Eu-Wau-Wau, Ureuwawau, or Kagwahiva, and its ISO 639-3 language code is "urz".

Culture
The Uru-Eu-Wau-Wau are hunter-gatherers. They use a poison made from tree bark on their arrows when hunting tapir and other game. They are known for their distinctive tattoos around their mouths made from genipapo, a black vegetal dye.

See also
Friends of Peoples Close to Nature, an NGO human rights organization that has worked with the Uru-Eu-Wau-Wau
Ten Thousand Years Older, 2002 documentary film about the tribes.
The Territory, a 2022 documentary, tells the story of these people's struggle to defend their existence from encroaching land grabbers and deforestation.

Notes

External links
Uru-Eu-Wau-Wau artwork, National Museum of the American Indian

Ethnic groups in Brazil
Indigenous peoples in Brazil
Indigenous peoples of the Amazon
Hunter-gatherers of South America